Ecpleopus is a genus of lizard in the family Gymnophthalmidae. The genus contains only one species, Ecpleopus gaudichaudii, which is endemic to Brazil.

Etymology
The specific name, gaudichaudii, is in honor of French botanist Charles Gaudichaud-Beaupré.

References

Further reading
Boulenger GA (1885). Catalogue of the Lizards in the British Museum (Natural History). Second Edition. Volume II. ... Teiidæ ... London: Trustees of the British Museum (Natural History). (Taylor and Francis, printers). xiii + 497 pp. + Plates I-XXIV. (Genus Ecpleopus, p. 401; species E. gaudichaudii, p. 401).
Duméril AMC, Bibron G (1839). Erpétologie générale ou Histoire naturelle complète des Reptiles. Tome cinquième [Volume 5]. Paris: Roret. viii + 854 pp. (Ecpleopus, new genus, pp. 434–436; Ecpleopus gaudichaudii, new species, pp. 436–438). (in French).
Uzzell, Thomas (1969). "The Status of the Genera Ecpleopus, Arthroseps, and Aspidolaemus (Sauria, Teiidae)". Postilla (135): 1-23.

Gymnophthalmidae
Monotypic lizard genera
Taxa named by André Marie Constant Duméril
Taxa named by Gabriel Bibron